Anthony Eugene Prior (born March 27, 1970) is a former American football defensive back who played six seasons in the National Football League (NFL) with the New York Jets, Minnesota Vikings, and Oakland Raiders. He was drafted by the New York Giants in the ninth round of the 1992 NFL Draft. He played college football at Washington State University and attended Rubidoux High School in Riverside, California. Prior was also a member of the Calgary Stampeders and BC Lions of the Canadian Football League.

References

External links
Just Sports Stats
College stats

Living people
1970 births
Players of American football from Massachusetts
American football defensive backs
African-American players of American football
Washington State Cougars football players
New York Jets players
Minnesota Vikings players
Oakland Raiders players
Calgary Stampeders players
BC Lions players
Sportspeople from Lowell, Massachusetts
21st-century African-American sportspeople
20th-century African-American sportspeople